The following are the national records in athletics in Uzbekistan maintained by the Athletic Federation of Uzbekistan (AFU).

Outdoor

Key to tables:

+ = en route to a longer distance

h = hand timing

A = affected by altitude

OT = oversized track (> 200m in circumference)

NWI = no wind information

Men

Women

Mixed

Indoor

Men

Women

Notes

References
General
Uzbekistani Outdoor Records 15 September 2022 updated
Uzbekistani Indoor Records 12 February 2023 updated
Specific

External links
 AFU web site

Uzbekistani
records
Athletics
Athletics